Ana Mihajlović (born May 20, 1987) is a Serbian fashion model widely known as the winner of the 2002 Elite Model Look.

Mihajlović has presented for numerous fashion houses, including Dolce & Gabbana, Balenciaga, Dries van Noten, Givenchy, John Galliano, Marc Jacobs, Miu Miu, Prada and Christian Dior.

References

External links

 
 
 Ana Mihaljovic at NYmag.com

Serbian female models
Living people
1986 births
People from Kragujevac